Gwanak Station is a station on the Seoul Subway Line 1 and the Gyeongbu Line. It takes its name from a famous mountain to the northeast.

Note that this station is not in Gwanak-gu, north of here.

A light rail line linking this station to Gwangmyeong (KTX) and Cheolsan (Line 7) is in the planning stages. Upon completion of the proposed LR line, Gwanak Station will potentially become an important transfer point for KTX passengers in the city of Anyang.

Vicinity

Exit 1 : Seoksu Market
Exit 2 : Gyeongin National University of Education (Anyang Campus), Samseong Elementary School

References

Seoul Metropolitan Subway stations
Metro stations in Anyang, Gyeonggi
Railway stations opened in 1974